Sovereignty is the defining authority within an individual consciousness, social construct or territory.

It may also refer to:

 Air sovereignty, the right of a sovereign state to regulate its airspace
 Consumer sovereignty, economic concept by which consumers have control over the production of goods through their consumer decisions
 Data sovereignty, the idea that data is subject to laws within the states it is collected
 Food sovereignty, systems in which food producers, distributors, and consumers control the policies and mechanisms of food production and distribution 
 Individual sovereignty, the moral or natural right of a person to have control over their own body and life
 Network sovereignty, Internet boundaries within which a state exhibits control
 Parliamentary sovereignty, principle of constitutional law that the legislative body has authority over other government institutions
 Popular sovereignty, principle that state authority is derived from the consent of its people
 Sovereignty (art exhibition), American sculptor Simone Leigh's American pavilion exhibition at the 2022 Venice Biennale
 Westphalian sovereignty, principle of international law in which states have exclusive authority to govern their territory